Justice Makani Narayana "M. N." Rao (born 22 April 1936) is a former Chief Justice of Himachal Pradesh, and former chairman of the National Commission on Backward Classes.

Rao enrolled as an advocate of the Andhra Pradesh High Court on 9 October 1961. He practiced before the court for more than 12 years, specializing in constitutional law. In 1979, Rao was appointed a legal secretary of the government of Andhra Pradesh, and was appointed a selection grade district judge on 25 July 1983.

Rao became Chairman of the Sales Tax Appellate Tribunal on 1 July 1985. He was later appointed a permanent judge of the Andhra Pradesh High Court on 11 July 1986. Rao was appointed Chief Justice of the Himachal Pradesh High Court on 6 November 1997. He retired on 22 April 1998;Currently living in Hyderabad,India.

References

 "Justice M.N. Rao Assumes Charge of Chairperson, National Commission for Backward Classes". pib.nic.in. Retrieved 2017-03-20.
 "Justice M.N. Rao takes over as BC Commission chief". thehindu.com. Retrieved 2017-03-20.
 "Justice Narayana Rao: Collegium System is Faulty". thehansindia.com. Retrieved 2017-03-20.

External links
 Former Chief Justices - Himachal Pradesh High Court
 http://www.supremecourtofindia.nic.in/circular/senioradvocates.pdf
 Himachal Pradesh High Court

1936 births
Living people
Chief Justices of the Himachal Pradesh High Court
People from Andhra Pradesh
Telugu people